Şotlanlı may refer to:
Şotlanlı, Agdam, Azerbaijan
Şotlanlı, Aghjabadi, Azerbaijan
Şotlanlı, Qubadli, Azerbaijan